Esper is an unincorporated community in Putnam County, in the U.S. state of Missouri.

The community most likely has the name of the local Esper family.

References

Unincorporated communities in Putnam County, Missouri
Unincorporated communities in Missouri